OGLE-TR-123 is a binary stellar system containing one of the smallest main-sequence stars whose radius has been measured.  It was discovered when the Optical Gravitational Lensing Experiment (OGLE) survey observed the smaller star eclipsing the larger primary.  The orbital period is approximately 1.80 days.  

The smaller star, OGLE-TR-123b, is estimated to have a radius around 0.13 solar radii, and a mass of around 0.085 solar masses, or approximately 90 times Jupiter's.  OGLE-TR-123b's mass is close to the lowest possible mass, estimated to be around 0.07 or 0.08 , for a hydrogen-fusing star.  OGLE-TR-123b is the second star with mass less than 0.1  whose radius has been directly measured; the first such star was the similar OGLE-TR-122b.

See also
 OGLE-TR-122
 EBLM J0555-57

References

Carina (constellation)
Eclipsing binaries
Carinae, V816

bg:OGLE-TR-122b
pl:OGLE-TR-122b
sk:OGLE-TR-122b